Parallel task scheduling  (also called parallel job scheduling or parallel processing scheduling) is an optimization problem in computer science and operations research. It is a variant of optimal job scheduling. In a general job scheduling problem, we are given n jobs J1, J2, ..., Jn of varying processing times, which need to be scheduled on m machines while trying to minimize the makespan - the total length of the schedule (that is, when all the jobs have finished processing). In the specific variant known as parallel-task scheduling, all machines are identical. Each job j has a length parameter pj and a size parameter qj, and it must run for exactly pj time-steps on exactly qj machines in parallel.

P means that there are several identical machines running in parallel; sizej means that each job has a size parameter; Cmax means that the goal is to minimize the maximum completion time. Some authors use   instead. Note that the problem of parallel-machines scheduling is a special case of parallel-task scheduling where  for all j, that is, each job should run on a single machine.

The origins of this problem formulation can be traced back to 1960. For this problem, there exists no polynomial time approximation algorithm with a ratio smaller than  unless .

Definition 

There is a set  of  jobs, and  identical machines. Each job  has a processing time  (also called the length of j), and requires the simultaneous use of  machines during its execution (also called the size or the width of j).

A schedule assigns each job  to a starting time  and a set  of  machines to be processed on. A schedule is feasible if each processor executes at most one job at any given time.
A sufficient condition for the feasibility of a schedule is the following

.

If this property is satisfied for all starting times, a feasible schedule can be generated by assigning free machines to the jobs at each time starting with time . Here a machine interval is a set of consecutive machines of maximal cardinality such that all machines in this set are processing the same job. A machine interval is completely specified by the index of its first and last machine. Therefore, it is possible to obtain a compact way of encoding the output with polynomial size.

Computational hardness 

In contrast, when the number of machines is at least 4, that is: for the variants  for any , the problem is also strongly NP-hard (this result improved a previous result showing strong NP-hardness for ).

If the number of machines is not bounded by a constant, then there can be no approximation algorithm with an approximation ratio smaller than  unless .

Variants 
Several variants of this problem have been studied. The following variants also have been considered in combination with each other.

Contiguous jobs: In this variant, the machines have a fixed order .  Instead of assigning the jobs to any subset , the jobs have to be assigned to a contiguous interval of machines. This problem corresponds to the problem formulation of the strip packing problem.

Multiple platforms: In this variant, the set of machines is partitioned into independent platforms. A scheduled job can only use the machines of one platform and is not allowed to span over multiple platforms when processed.

Moldable jobs: In this variant each job  has a set of feasible machine-counts . For each count , the job can be processed on d machines in parallel, and in this case, its processing time will be .

It must be scheduled after that time.

Algorithms 

The list scheduling algorithm by Garey and Graham has an absolute ratio , as pointed out by Turek et al. and Ludwig and Tiwari. 
Feldmann, Sgall and Teng observed that the length of a non-preemptive schedule produced by the list scheduling algorithm is actually at most  times the optimum preemptive makespan.
Later, Jansen and Thöle  found a PTAS for the case where the number of processors is polynomially bounded in the number of jobs. 
In this algorithm, the number of machines appears polynomially in the time complexity of the algorithm. 
Since, in general, the number of machines appears only in logarithmic in the size of the instance, this algorithm is a pseudo-polynomial time approximation scheme as well. 
A -approximation was given by Jansen, which closes the gap to the lower bound of  except for an arbitrarily small .

Differences between contiguous and non-contiguous jobs 

Given an instance of the parallel task scheduling problem, the optimal makespan can differ depending on the constraint to the contiguity of the machines. If the jobs can be scheduled on non-contiguous machines, the optimal makespan can be smaller than in the case that they have to be scheduled on contiguous ones.
Błądek et al. studied these so-called  c/nc-differences and proved the following points:

 For a c/nc-difference to arise, there must be at least three tasks with 
 For a c/nc-difference to arise, there must be at least three tasks with  
 For a c/nc-difference to arise, at least  processors are required (and there exists an instance with a c/nc-difference with ).
 For a c/nc-difference to arise, the non-contiguous schedule length must be at least 
 The maximal c/nc-difference  is at least  and at most 
 To decide whether there is an c/nc-difference in a given instance is NP-complete.

Furthermore, they proposed the following two conjectures, which remain unproven:

 For a c/nc-difference to arise, at least  tasks are required.

Related problems 
There are related scheduling problems in which each job consists of several operations, which must be executed in sequence (rather than in parallel). These are the problems of open shop scheduling, flow shop scheduling and job shop scheduling.

References

Optimal scheduling
Packing problems